APCS may refer to:
 Serum amyloid P component, a human gene
 AP Computer Science
 Academics Plus Charter Schools, in Arkansas
 Avoyelles Public Charter School, Mansura, Louisiana

See also
 APC (disambiguation)